Zohrab Ali Sara (also Romanized as Z̧ohrāb ‘Alī Sarā) is a village in Otaqvar Rural District, Otaqvar District, Langarud County, Gilan Province, Iran. At the 2006 census, its population was 85, in 22 families.

References 

Populated places in Langarud County